The fifth season of the American sitcom The Big Bang Theory was originally aired on CBS from September 22, 2011, to May 10, 2012, over 24 episodes.

At the 64th Primetime Emmy Awards, The Big Bang Theory was nominated for Outstanding Comedy Series, but Modern Family on ABC won. The show was also nominated for Outstanding Technical Direction, Camerawork, Video Control for a Series and Outstanding Multi-Camera Picture Editing For A Comedy Series. 

Jim Parsons (Sheldon Cooper) was nominated for Outstanding Lead Actor in a Comedy Series for "The Werewolf Transformation", but lost out to Jon Cryer. Mayim Bialik (Amy Farrah Fowler) was nominated for Outstanding Supporting Actress in a Comedy Series for "The Shiny Trinket Maneuver", but lost out to Julie Bowen.

Overview
Penny regrets her sleeping with Raj and has become very good friends with Leonard, Leonard breaks up with Priya, Amy pushes Sheldon in their relationship eventually becoming boyfriend and girlfriend, Penny and the other women become a clique of their own, Howard prepares for his wedding and going into space to the International Space Station and Leonard asks Penny out as they begin "Leonard and Penny 2.0".

Cast

Main cast
 Johnny Galecki as Dr. Leonard Hofstadter
 Jim Parsons as Dr. Sheldon Cooper
 Kaley Cuoco as Penny
 Simon Helberg as Howard Wolowitz
 Kunal Nayyar as Dr. Rajesh "Raj" Koothrappali
 Mayim Bialik as Dr. Amy Farrah Fowler
 Melissa Rauch as Dr. Bernadette Rostenkowski

Special guest cast
 Brent Spiner as himself
 Leonard Nimoy as Spock (voice)

Recurring cast
 Christine Baranski as Dr. Beverly Hofstadter
 Aarti Mann as Priya Koothrappali,
 Brian George as Dr. V.M. Koothrappali
 Alice Amter as Mrs. Koothrappali
 Carol Ann Susi as Mrs. Wolowitz
 Wil Wheaton as himself
 Kevin Sussman as Stuart Bloom
 Laurie Metcalf as Mary Cooper
 John Ross Bowie as Dr. Barry Kripke
 Mike Massimino as himself
 Joshua Malina as President Siebert
 Vernee Watson as Althea
 Casey Sander as Mike Rostenkowski
 Pasha Lychnikoff as Dimitri Rezinov
 Stephen Hawking as himself

Guest cast
 Katie Leclerc as Emily
 Courtney Ford as Alice
 Blake Berris as Kevin
 Ashley Austin Morris as Laura
 Josh Brener as Dale
 Lance Barber as Jimmy Speckerman
 Jonathan Schmock as Jonathan
 Jim Turner as Reverend White
 Becky O'Donohue as Siri
 Lynn Phillip Seibel as Professor Rothman
 Peter Onorati as Angelo
 Chriselle Almeida as Lakshmi
 Robert Clotworthy as Dave Roeger (voice)
 Amy Tolsky as Joan

Production 
Several high-profile celebrities appear in the season. In "The Transporter Malfunction", actor Leonard Nimoy appears as a voice actor, playing an action-figure Spock that Sheldon imagines talking to him. In the following episode, "The Hawking Excitation", cosmologist Stephen Hawking appears as a guest star. Astronaut Mike Massimino appears in "The Friendship Contraction" and "The Countdown Reflection".

Stephen Hawking went on to appear in the season 6 episode "The Extract Obliteration" and the season 7 episode "The Relationship Diremption". Mike Massimino later appeared in the season 6 episodes "The Decoupling Fluctuation" and "The Re-Entry Minimization".

The season finale depicts Howard Wolowitz traveling to the International Space Station (ISS) on board a Soyuz rocket. Thanks to technical consulting from astronaut Mike Massimino, who also plays himself on the show, the production crew was able to put together sets that realistically depicts the Soyuz capsule and the ISS. The Soyuz capsule was constructed based on photos from NASA, the Kansas Cosmosphere for dimensions, and scavenged parts from an aerospace junkyard in Los Angeles.

Episodes

Release

Critical reception 
The fifth season received critical acclaim. On Rotten Tomatoes, 100% of seven critics gave the season a positive review.

Oliver Sava of The A.V. Club gave the season a B+ rating. He described Raj as the "weak link of the show" as he has not "[evolved] like the rest of the cast" and is "trapped in season one mode". Sava gave high ratings to episodes where Raj did not feature prominently, such as "The Pulled Groin Extrapolation" or "The Russian Rocket Reaction" and described "The Wiggly Finger Catalyst" (an episode focusing on Raj) as "one of the series' worst", giving it a D+ rating. Sava's favorite relationship on the series is between Amy and Penny.

Jenna Busch of IGN disliked the previous season but said that season 5 "is far more balanced"; Busch gave season 5 episodes ratings between 5.5 and 9, with an average rating of 8.0. She also noted that the show has "matured" by including other women in the main cast.

Tom Gliatto from People gave the season 3 out of 4 stars, stating that it is "bright and obvious as a cartoon, yet written with a clean, precise patter of jokes".

Awards 
At the 64th Primetime Emmy Awards, The Big Bang Theory was nominated for Outstanding Comedy Series, but Modern Family on ABC won. The show was also nominated for Outstanding Technical Direction, Camerawork, Video Control for a Series and Outstanding Multi-Camera Picture Editing For A Comedy Series.

Jim Parsons (Sheldon Cooper) was nominated for Outstanding Lead Actor in a Comedy Series for "The Werewolf Transformation", but lost out to Jon Cryer. Mayim Bialik (Amy Farrah Fowler) was nominated for Outstanding Supporting Actress in a Comedy Series for "The Shiny Trinket Maneuver", but lost out to Julie Bowen.

Distribution 
The season premiered on CBS on September 22, 2011. It was released on DVD with an aspect ratio of 16:9 format on September 11, 2011, in Region 1, on September 2, 2012, in Region 2 and October 3, 2012, in Region 4. The episodes can also be purchased on Amazon Video or the iTunes store in the US.

Broadcast

U.S. Nielsen ratings

Canadian broadcast
In Canada, The Big Bang Theory aired on CTV Television Network. The season premiere ("The Skank Reflex Analysis") garnered 3.72 million viewers and the finale was watched by 4.04 million households. Most episodes were the most watched programme in Canada that week. The highest rating in season 5 was 4.05 million, for "The Infestation Hypothesis", and the lowest rating was 3.17 million, for "The Stag Convergence".

References 

General references

External links

2011 American television seasons
2012 American television seasons
The Big Bang Theory seasons